Sasa Misic may refer to:

Saša Mišić (born 24 August 1987), Serbian football goalkeeper
Saša Mišić (water polo) (born 27 March 1987), Montenegrin water polo player